KBVA (106.5 MHz) is a commercial FM broadcasts in HD with 2 sub channels radio station licensed to Bella Vista, Arkansas, and serving Southwest Missouri, Northwest Arkansas and northeast Oklahoma. The station is owned by John Lykins, through licensee Rox Radio Group, LLC. The station airs a combination of Oldies and Classic Hits formats, with hits from the 50s, 60, 70s and 80s, with a more enhanced and a larger playlist. The playlist includes a couple of adult standards each hour from artists such as Frank Sinatra, Nat King Cole, Barbra Streisand and Perry Como.  KBVA carries the syndicated John Tesh "Intelligence for Your Life" show in afternoons. The station contains hourly news updates which are provided by ABC News Radio.

The studios and offices are on American Street in Springdale, Arkansas.  The transmitter is off Y City Road in Decatur, Arkansas.  KBVA's signal is heard in sections of Arkansas, Missouri and Oklahoma.

History
In November 1991, the station signed on the air.  KBVA's original owner was Gayla Joy Hendren McKenzie, the daughter of Republican politician Kim Hendren and the sister of current state senator Jim Hendren. The station carried political advertising for Kim Hendren's unsuccessful bid in 2010 for the United States Senate.

McKenzie sold KBVA to Hog Radio effective July 31, 2017 for $1.15 million, which rebranded the station from "Variety 106.5" to "Lite 106.5". It is the only radio station in the Fayetteville market to have an Adult Standards format in 2021.

Hog Radio sold KBVA, three sister stations, and a translator to John Lykins' Rox Radio Group, LLC for $3 million effective January 27, 2021.

References

External links

BVA
Classic hits radio stations in the United States
Adult standards radio stations in the United States
Soft adult contemporary radio stations in the United States
Radio stations established in 1993
1993 establishments in Arkansas
Bella Vista, Arkansas